The Royal Chapel is a church inside Stockholm Palace. It was opened in 1754.

The royal palace chapels (including the Royal Chapel of Stockholm Palace, the Royal Chapel of Drottningholm Palace, and Riddarholmen Church) are all part of the national Church of Sweden, although their management is in the hands of the Office of the Marshal of the Realm, as part of the Royal Estate.

Royal weddings 
Recent royal weddings have taken place in the chapel include:
 Princess Christina married Tord Magnuson on 15 June 1974
 Princess Madeleine, Duchess of Hälsingland and Gästrikland married Christopher O'Neill on 8 June 2013 
 Prince Carl Philip, Duke of Värmland married Sofia Hellqvist on 13 June 2015

Baptism  
Royal baptisms are often held in the royal chapel. The recent ones include:
 Princess Estelle, Duchess of Östergötland (Christening 22 May 2012), eldest daughter of Crown Princess Victoria of Sweden and her husband Daniel Westling, first granddaughter of King Carl XVI Gustaf of Sweden and his wife Queen Silvia

References

External links

18th-century Church of Sweden church buildings
Churches in Stockholm
Churches completed in 1754
1754 establishments in Sweden
Churches in the Diocese of Stockholm (Church of Sweden)